Island Princess is a Coral-class cruise ship for the Princess Cruises line. She was constructed at Chantiers de l'Atlantique, France.

Route and history
Island Princesss main itinerary consist of seven day Alaskan cruises from Vancouver, British Columbia to Whittier, Alaska during the summer months. During the fall, winter, and spring, Island Princess and her sister ship Coral Princess run 10/14-15 day Panama Canal cruises with stops in Cabo San Lucas, Mexico, San Juan del Sur, Puntarenas, Costa Rica, Cartagena, Colombia, and Oranjestad, Aruba.

The ship has had outbreaks of community-spread illnesses. Norovirus hit the ship in March 2006 (72 passengers, 16 crew), October 2006 (109 passengers, 11 crew), January 2007 (179 passengers, 37 crew), January 2018 (71 passengers, 7 crew), February 2019 (101 passengers, 9 crew), e. coli and Shigella in April 2009 (100 passengers, 8 crew), and unknown outbreaks in two May-June 2004 sailings (441 passengers, 68 crew).

In 2015 Island Princess sailed on cruises for the first time in Europe, traveling between Barcelona and Venice.

In 2019/2020 cruise season, Island Princess will continue to operate the West Coast cruises.

As part of the COVID-19 pandemic on cruise ships, the ship repatriated crew members to Asia in April 2020. In May 2020, the summer cruise schedule for the ship was cancelled.

References

External links
 Princess Cruises site
 

Ships of Princess Cruises
Ships built in France
Panamax cruise ships
2002 ships